In geometry, the order-8 pentagonal tiling is a regular tiling of the hyperbolic plane. It has Schläfli symbol of {5,8}.

See also

Uniform tilings in hyperbolic plane
List of regular polytopes

References

 John H. Conway, Heidi Burgiel, Chaim Goodman-Strass, The Symmetries of Things 2008,  (Chapter 19, The Hyperbolic Archimedean Tessellations)

External links 

 Hyperbolic and Spherical Tiling Gallery
 KaleidoTile 3: Educational software to create spherical, planar and hyperbolic tilings
 Hyperbolic Planar Tessellations, Don Hatch

Hyperbolic tilings
Isogonal tilings
Isohedral tilings
Order-8 tilings
Pentagonal tilings
Regular tilings